High Crystal is a science fiction/secret agent novel by Martin Caidin that was first published in 1974. It was the second sequel to Caidin's 1972 work Cyborg, which in turn was the basis for the television series The Six Million Dollar Man. Although published after the start of the television series, the book does not share continuity with it.

Plot summary

Steve Austin, an operative for the US government who is part man, part machine, is sent to Peru to investigate a mysterious power source in the ruins of an ancient civilization, but Austin and his team soon discover that a criminal organization also has their sights set on obtaining the power contained within the "High Crystal".

1974 American novels
1974 science fiction novels
American spy novels
Novels about ancient astronauts
Novels set in Peru
Bionic franchise
Arbor House books
Novels by Martin Caidin